is a funicular railway station located in the city of Ōtsu, Shiga Prefecture, Japan, operated by the private railway company Hieizan Railway.

Lines
The train will stop only when it is notified in advance or when there is a call from the telephone installed at the station, and it usually passes.

Station layout
The station consists of a single wooden side platform with no station building. There is a slope of 333 ‰ in the vicinity, but the platform is not stepped, and only non-slip cross timbers are struck on the board, which is slippery when wet. In the middle of the platform, there is a small shed and a bench that can seat 2 to 3 people.

Adjacent stations

History
It was renamed January 15. 1974.

Surrounding area
 Grave of Ki no Tsurayuki

See also
List of railway stations in Japan

External links

Sakamoto Cable official home page

Railway stations in Shiga Prefecture
Railway stations in Japan opened in 1949
Railway stations in Ōtsu